Astore was the name of at least three ships of the Italian Navy and may refer to:

 , a  launched in 1907 and discarded in 1923.
 , a  launched in 1934 she was sold to Sweden in 1940 and renamed HSwMS Remus.
 , a  launched in 1981 and decommissioned in 2005.

Italian Navy ship names